Chinese BASIC is the name given to several Chinese-localized versions of the BASIC programming language in the early 1980s.

Versions 
At least two versions of Chinese BASIC were modified Applesoft BASIC that accepted Chinese commands and variables. They were built into some Taiwan-made Apple II clones. One of these was shipped with the best-selling Multitech Microprofessor II (known as Acer today). Another version was shipped with MiTAC's Little Intelligent Computer.

In addition to Apple II clones, Multitech also developed a Zilog Z80-based port of the Chinese BASIC for its own line of high-end computers.

Example 
In a typical Chinese BASIC environment, Chinese and English commands are interchangeable. It may also accept Chinese and Latin alphabet variables.

The Chinese characters used as variables are the 24 radicals of the Cangjie method, one of the earliest QWERTY keyboard-compatible Chinese input methods. 

The significant length of an Applesoft BASIC variable name is restricted to two bytes. In Multitech's Chinese BASIC, a variable can be 3 bytes long (one Chinese character + one numeral).

See also 
 Non-English-based programming languages

References

External links 
 A page of the Chinese BASIC manual (in traditional Chinese)
 RoboMind: educational programming language in Chinese

Non-English-based programming languages
Discontinued Microsoft BASICs
Chinese-language computing
BASIC programming language family